Simon Thompson is an make-up artist who was nominated at the 70th Academy Awards for his work on the film Titanic in the category of Best Makeup. He shared his nomination with Greg Cannom and Tina Earnshaw.

Selected filmography

 The French Lieutenant's Woman (1981)
 Emma (1996)
 Titanic (1997)

References

External links

Living people
Year of birth missing (living people)
Make-up artists
Place of birth missing (living people)